Jacob Cruz (born January 28, 1973), is an American professional baseball former outfielder and current coach. He is an assistant hitting coach for the San Francisco Giants of Major League Baseball (MLB) and previously played professionally in South Korea and Mexico.

College
Cruz was drafted in the 1st round (32nd overall) of the 1994 Major League Baseball draft by the San Francisco Giants, signing the next month.

Major League Baseball
Cruz would make his Major League debut on July 18, 1996. On June 2, the Indians traded Cruz to the Colorado Rockies for Jody Gerut and Josh Bard. Cruz would play 44 games for the Rockies and 20 for their Triple-A affiliate, the Colorado Springs Sky Sox, before being released by the Rockies on November 30, 2001.

On December 21, 2001, Cruz signed with the Detroit Tigers. Cruz played 35 games for the Tigers and was released on October 3, . On December 27, 2002, Cruz signed with the Cincinnati Reds. Released by the Reds on April 14, Cruz signed a minor league contract with the New York Mets on May 30, 2006. Cruz played 55 games for the Mets Triple-A affiliate, the Norfolk Tides, the rest of the year and was granted free agency at the end of the season.

Korea
Before the start of the  season, Cruz signed a contract with the Hanwha Eagles of the Korea Baseball Organization. Cruz had an excellent season with the Eagles, hitting .321 with 22 home runs and 85 RBI. Before the start of the  season, Cruz signed with the Samsung Lions. Cruz was cut by the Lions on May 23, 2008.

Mexico
After his release from the Lions, Cruz signed to play for the Tijuana Potros of the Mexican Baseball League for the 2008 season. In 2009, he played for the Chihuahua Dorados.

American Association
On August 9, 2010, Cruz was signed by the Sioux City Explorers of the American Association and batted .400 in 80 at-bats.  He also hit 4 home runs and had 26 RBI.

Coaching career
On December 13, 2010, the Arizona Diamondbacks hired Cruz to be the Hitting Coach of the Yakima Bears, the Diamondbacks Short Season Class A team.  On November 22, 2011 Cruz was promoted to Hitting Coach of the Visalia Rawhide, the Diamondbacks Advanced Class A team. Cruz was the hitting coach for the Tennessee Smokies in 2017 and 2018. Cruz then served as the Pittsburgh Pirates assistant hitting coach for the 2019 season. Cruz was hired as the assistant hitting coach for the Milwaukee Brewers prior to the 2020 season. Cruz was permitted to speak to other teams following the conclusion of the Brewers' 2021 season.

References

External links
  
Career statistics and player information from Korea Baseball Organization
Korean Info

1973 births
Living people
American baseball players of Mexican descent
American expatriate baseball players in Mexico
American expatriate baseball players in South Korea
American expatriate baseball players in Taiwan
Baseball coaches from California
Baseball players from California
Buffalo Bisons (minor league) players
Cleveland Indians players
Colorado Springs Sky Sox players
Colorado Rockies players
Cincinnati Reds players
Detroit Tigers players
Dorados de Chihuahua players
Fresno Grizzlies players
Hanwha Eagles players
KBO League outfielders
La New Bears players
Louisville Bats players
Major League Baseball hitting coaches
Major League Baseball outfielders
Mexican League baseball first basemen
Mexican League baseball left fielders
Mexican League baseball right fielders
Milwaukee Brewers coaches
Minor league baseball coaches
Norfolk Tides players
Phoenix Firebirds players
Pittsburgh Pirates coaches
Samsung Lions players
San Francisco Giants players
San Jose Giants players
Shreveport Captains players
Sioux City Explorers players
Sportspeople from Oxnard, California
Sportspeople from Ventura County, California
Toledo Mud Hens players